The Financial Literacy and Education Commission (the Commission) was established under Title V, the Financial Literacy and Education Improvement Act which was part of the Fair and Accurate Credit Transactions Act (FACT) Act of 2003, to improve financial literacy and education of persons in the United States. The FACT Act named the Secretary of the Treasury as head of the Commission and required 20 other federal agencies and bureaus to participate in the Commission. The Commission coordinates the financial education efforts throughout the federal government, supports the promotion of financial literacy by the private sector while also encouraging the synchronization of efforts between the public and private sectors.

National strategy

Taking Ownership of the Future: The National Strategy for Financial Literacy is a comprehensive blueprint for improving financial literacy in America, published by the Commission. This national strategy covers 13 areas of financial education and contains 26 specific calls to action.

Members

Member departments and agencies include:

Board of Governors of the Federal Reserve System
Commodity Futures Trading Commission
Federal Deposit Insurance Corporation
Federal Trade Commission
National Credit Union Administration
Office of the Comptroller of the Currency
Office of Thrift Supervision
Small Business Administration
Social Security Administration
U.S. Department of Agriculture
U.S. Department of Defense
U.S. Department of Education
U.S. General Services Administration
U.S. Department of Health and Human Services
U.S. Department of Housing and Urban Development
U.S. Department of Labor
United States Office of Personnel Management
U.S. Department of the Treasury
U.S. Department of Veterans Affairs
U.S. Securities and Exchange Commission

See also 
 Personal finance

References

External links

Financial economics
Government agencies established in 2003
Personal finance education